The Tap Pilam Coahuiltecan Nation is a cultural heritage organization of individuals who identify as descendants of the Coahuiltecan people. They have a nonprofit organization, the American Indians in Texas-Spanish Colonial Missions, based in San Antonio, Texas.

The Tap Pilam Coahuiltecan Nation is an unrecognized organization. Despite using the word nation in its name, the group is neither a federally recognized tribe nor a state-recognized tribe.

Texas has "no legal mechanism to recognize tribes" and has no state-recognized tribes. However, the state legislature passed a congratulatory resolution, that is an honorific and non-legally binding resolution, H.R. No. 787 honoring the Tap Pilam-Coahuiltecan Nation.

Organization 
In 1994, the Tap Pilam Coahuiltecan Nation formed American Indians in Texas–Spanish Colonial Missions, also known as AIT-SCM as a 501(c)(3) nonprofit organization, based in San Antonio, Texas.

Their subject area is cultural and ethnic awareness. Their mission statement is "Preservation and protection of the culture and traditions of the Tap Pilam Coahuittecan Nation."

Their administration includes:
 Executive director: Ramon Vasquez
 President: Mary Jessie Garza
 Vice president: Miguel Acosta
 Development coordination: Karla Aguilar.

Petition for federal recognition 
In 1997, Tap Pilam: The Coahuiltecan Nation sent a letter of intent to petition for federal recognition. They have not followed up with a petition for federal recognition, however.

Activities 
The organization claims descent from the American Indians buried at the Alamo Mission in San Antonio and in 2020 filed a lawsuit against the Alamo Trust, Texas Land Office, Texas Historical Commission, and their leaders in the U.S. District Court. The lawsuit was dismissed. Stephen Chang of the Texas General Land Office (GLO) said, “The GLO has won every case that Tap Pilam has brought against the state. ... Courts have consistently rejected Tap Pilam’s claims because of their baseless claims."

See also 
 Carrizo Comecrudo Nation of Texas

References

External links
 Tap Pilam Coahuiltecan Nation
 American Indians in Texas–Spanish Colonial Missions, nonprofit organization

Cultural organizations based in Texas
Non-profit organizations based in Texas
1994 establishments in Texas
Unrecognized tribes in the United States